The Pinnacle is a 22-story skyscraper in the Buckhead district of Atlanta.  Built at the corner of Lenox and Peachtree Roads, construction was finished in 1998. Given that Buckhead is the financial center of both Atlanta and the Southeast, many of the buildings tenants are in the financial sector, including brokerage and consulting firms such as Merrill Lynch and Morgan Stanley.

See also
 List of tallest buildings in Atlanta

References

External links
 Emporis

Office buildings completed in 1998
Office buildings in Atlanta